Xianxia Township is a township in Yudu County, Jiangxi, China. , it administers the following 18 villages:
Xianxia Village
Guanbei Village
Shangfang Village
Yangtian Village
Shikeng Village
Shibei Village
Fukeng Village
Fuxing Village
Tanshi Village
Sanguan Village
Shanduan Village
Zoukeng Village
Xiyang Village
Ji Village
Luanshi Village
Liantang Village
Gaoxing Village
Longxi Village

References 

Township-level divisions of Jiangxi
Yudu County